Crocomela erectistria is a moth of the subfamily Arctiinae. It is found in Ecuador.

It is involved in Müllerian mimicry with Lyces striata.

The larvae feed on Boraginaceae species.

External links
 Species info

Arctiinae